Steve Brown may refer to:

Music
 Steve Brown (bass player) (1890–1965), American jazz double bassist with the New Orleans Rhythm Kings
 Steve Brown (guitarist) (born 1942), American jazz guitarist with Chuck Israels' band
 Steve Brown (composer) (born 1958), UK television music composer

Sports
 Steve Brown (American football) (born 1960), American football player
 Steve Brown (athlete) (born 1969), Trinidad and Tobago hurdler
 Steve Brown (baseball) (born 1957), American baseball player
 Steve Brown (cricketer) (born 1963), New Zealand cricketer
 Steve Brown (curler) (born 1947), American curler and coach
 Steve Brown (darts player, born 1962), English-American darts player
 Steve Brown (darts player, born 1981), English darts player
 Steve Brown (footballer, born 1961), Scottish footballer
 Steve Brown (footballer, born 1966), English footballer
 Steve Brown (footballer, born 1972), English footballer
 Steve Brown (footballer, born 1973), English footballer
 Steve Brown (ice hockey) (born 1965), Canadian former professional ice hockey and roller hockey player
 Steve Brown (wheelchair rugby) (born 1981), British wheelchair rugby player and Paralympian

Other
 Stephen D. M. Brown, (born 1955), British scientist
 Steve Brown (author), American pastor, syndicated radio host, and seminary professor
 Steve Brown (yo-yo player) (born 1976), American yo-yo player

See also
 Stevie Brown (born 1987), American National Football League safety
 Stephen Brown (disambiguation)